Krchleby is a municipality and village in Šumperk District in the Olomouc Region of the Czech Republic. It has about 200 inhabitants.

History
The first written mention of Krchleby is from 1273.

References

Villages in Šumperk District